Livoberezhna line may refer to:
 Livoberezhna line (Kiev Light Rail), an existing line of the Kiev Light Rail system
 Livoberezhna line (Kiev Metro), a planned line of the Kiev Metro system